The 2016 Portland Timbers 2 season is the 2nd season for the Portland Timbers 2 in United Soccer League (USL), the third-division professional soccer league in the United States and Canada. Portland Timbers 2 are the reserve team of MLS side, Portland Timbers.

Background

Competitions

United Soccer League

Preseason

USL regular season

Results by round

Results by location

USL Playoffs

Western Conference standings

U.S. Open Cup 
Beginning 2016 and forward, Portland Timbers 2 will not be eligible to enter the U.S. Open Cup per the USSF rule stating that any USL club that is owned by an MLS club is unable to enter the tournament.

Friendlies 
There were no friendlies for the 2016 season.

Club

Executive staff

Coaching staff

Stadiums

Kits

Primary kits
Portland Timbers 2 will be using the same first kit as first Portland Timbers but instead will have USL patches instead of MLS patches on it. It features a large chevron on the chest with its primary colors being dark green, light green, and white.  It features the Portland Timber's community program "Stand Together" on the front.

Secondary kits

Third/alternative  kit

First team

Roster
All players contracted to the club during the season included.  Players added from parent club Portland Timbers when added to USL roster
Last updated: June 13, 2016

 (Loan) = On Loan
 (T) = Loaned in from Portland Timbers (parent club)
 (U18) = Former Portland Timbers U-18 player
 (U23) = Former Portland Timbers U-23 player
 (SD) = 2016 MLS Superdraft Pick

Transfers

Transfers in

Loans in

Loans out

Transfers out

Contract Extensions

Staff in

Staff out

National Team Participation

Statistics

Appearances

Goalkeeper stats

Top scorers
The list is sorted by shirt number when total goals are equal.

Top assists
The list is sorted by shirt number when total assists are equal.

Clean sheets
The list is sorted by shirt number when total appearances are equal.

Summary

See also 
 2016 Portland Timbers season
 2016 USL season

References 

 

2016
Portland Timbers 2
Portland Timbers 2
Portland Timbers 2
Portland